Exallage is a genus of flowering plants in the family Rubiaceae. The genus is found from tropical and subtropical Asia to the southwestern Pacific.

Species

Exallage angustifolia 
Exallage auricularia 
Exallage barbata 
Exallage buruensis 
Exallage chrysotricha 
Exallage ciliicaulis 
Exallage costata 
Exallage fulva 
Exallage havilandii 
Exallage insularis 
Exallage kunstleri 
Exallage lapeyrousei 
Exallage latifolia 
Exallage macrophylla 
Exallage microcephala 
Exallage pachycarpa 
Exallage paradoxa 
Exallage parietarioides 
Exallage perhispida 
Exallage pressa 
Exallage radicans 
Exallage ulmifolia

References

Rubiaceae genera
Spermacoceae